The Games: Winter Challenge  is a sports video game published by Accolade for MS-DOS compatible operating systems in 1991. It portrays eight winter sports events that are competed in during the Winter Olympics. The game is not licensed from or endorsed by the International Olympic Committee, the United States Olympic Committee, or any similar organization for any other country. A Sega Genesis port was released in 1991 with the title shortened to Winter Challenge.

Gameplay
Most of the games use the directional pad for steering, and the A, B, and C buttons for performing certain functions like shooting, running, braking, or pushing off, as you would for the ski jump. Button mashing was necessary at times for a couple of the events, but most are focused on timing and accuracy. The ski jump is scored by distance, and the biathlon is scored by time and shooting accuracy. All the other events are scored by time.

Events
 Luge
 Downhill skiing
 Cross-country skiing
 Bobsled
 Speed skating
 Giant slalom
 Biathlon
 Ski jump

Modes
In Training mode, the player can participate in a single event as one player. Once completed, the player can go again, return to the main menu, or watch an instant replay of their performance.

The other mode is Tournament mode where the player can create and participate with up to ten players. If fewer  than ten players are created, the computer provides the rest. Once the players are selected, the game shows an Opening Ceremonies clip and then takes the player to a tournament screen where they can see their icons for the seven events, as well as four buttons that shows their current standings, starts a new tournament, allows the entering of a password to return to an existing tournament, or return to the main menu.

Reception
Computer Gaming World liked the game's graphics and the quick play, and recommended it to those interested in downhill skiing.

References

1991 video games
Accolade (company) games
DOS games
Winter Olympic video games
Sega Genesis games
Skiing video games
Multiplayer and single-player video games
Video games developed in the United States